Maria of Jülich-Berg (3 August 1491 – 29 August 1543) was the Duchess of Jülich-Berg, as the daughter of Wilhelm IV, Duke of Jülich-Berg and Sibylle of Brandenburg. She became heiress to her father’s estates of Jülich, Berg and Ravensberg after it had become apparent that her parents’ marriage would not produce any more children. In 1509, Maria married John III, Duke of Cleves. Their daughter, Anna, became the consort of King Henry VIII of England.

Life 
Duchess Maria was born on 3 August 1491 in Jülich, Germany, as the daughter of Duke Wilhelm IV and Duchess Sibylle. In 1496, at the age of 5, Duchess Maria was betrothed to the 6-year-old Duke of Cleves, John. Eventually, in 1509, they married. Maria's estates and titles were then merged with the Duchy of Cleves.  

The marriage resulted in the Cleves Union, in which the Duchies of Jülich-Berg-Ravensberg and Cleves-Mark were combined to form the United Duchies of Jülich-Cleves-Berg.  

When her father died in 1511 Maria, being female, could not inherit, and Jülich-Berg-Ravensberg fell to her husband John III through her.  At the request of Maria and John II, who resided in Cleves, Maria's mother Sibylle acted as governor of Jülich-Berg during this period.  John, who inherited the Duchy of Cleves-Mark in 1521, then became the first ruler of the United Duchies of Jülich-Cleves-Berg, which would exist until 1666.

She and John III had three daughters and a son. Sibylle (1512–1554), William, Duke of Jülich-Cleves-Berg (Wilhelm) (1516–1592), Amalia (1517–1586), and Anne (1515–1557) who was Queen consort of England from 6 January 1540 to 9 July 1540 to King Henry VIII.

Maria was a traditional Catholic who gave her daughters a practical education on how to run a noble household, which was the norm for German noblewomen during the time period. This differed from  the education typically given to daughters of the English nobility and gentry. In The Wives of Henry VIII, Antonia Fraser suggests that, following their marriage, one reason Henry VIII disliked her daughter Anne so much was that, unlike his first two wives and many of the court ladies around him, Anne did not possess educational and musical accomplishments and was ill-equipped to function in the contentious English court. Duchess Maria herself appears not to have favored sending her daughter to England. She wrote in a later correspondence she loved her daughter so much that she was 'loath to suffer her to depart her'.

Children

Ancestry

References

Sources

People from the Duchy of Cleves
1491 births
1543 deaths
Maria
Maria
Maria
Maria
Countesses of Ravensberg